Salwe are issues for Burmese orders. A salwe is a shoulder-belt formed with metal chains, normally fashioned in gold or silver, which are fastened in four places, in shields or bosses, and worn over the shoulder like an officer's sash.

The Burmese monarchy used the salwe was purely secular, as it was used to recognize merit and service to the state.

Etymology and origins

The Burmese language word salwe  is a corruption of the Hindi term janeu (जनेऊ). Janeu (also known as upanayana) in Hindi, refers to a sacred investiture or Brahminical cord found in the higher castes of Hindu society.

It is of ancient Burmese origin. The salwe is referenced in the Salwedin Sadan (Book of the Order), a Burmese text that states the number of salwe cords that members of each of the four Hindu varnas wore:
Rulers (Khattiya) - 9 cords
Ritualists (Brahmana) - 6 cords
Merchants (Vessa) - 1-3 cords
Commoners (Sudda) - none

Usage

The number of strands or threads indicate rank in the order. The salwe was worn as a symbol of high character, to maintain the purity of character of one's family or caste.

During the Konbaung Dynasty, high-ranking ministers with immunity from various forms of execution (thetdawshay) also wore salwe of 18 strands. The following is a list of Konbaung-era grades and corresponding number of salwe strands conferred:

Current usage

The following salwes are currently issued by the Government of Burma:
Pyidaungsu Sithu Thingaha
Thiri Thudhamma Thingaha

References

See also

Burmese culture
Orders, decorations, and medals of Myanmar